18th Newtownabbey Old Boys' Football Club is a Northern Irish, intermediate football club playing in Division 1C of the Northern Amateur Football League. The club is based in Newtownabbey. The club plays in the Irish Cup.

References

External links
 Club website

Association football clubs in Northern Ireland
Association football clubs in County Antrim
Northern Amateur Football League clubs